Piotrowice Świdnickie  is a village in the urban-rural Gmina Jaworzyna Śląska, within Świdnica County, Lower Silesian Voivodeship, in south-western Poland. Prior to 1945 it was in Germany.

The village's name probably derives from the name of a Lokator who brought German farmers to the village.

References

Villages in Świdnica County